On 6 November 2001, the separatist Basque organization ETA detonated a car bomb on Corazón de María street in Madrid, Spain. The blast injured about 99 people. It has been claimed the ETA targeted Juan Junquera, a government official, who survived.

The attack was one of many that occurred in Madrid in 2001 in the ETA's campaign.

See also 
2000 Madrid bombing
 List of ETA attacks

References

ETA (separatist group) actions
Terrorist incidents in Spain
2001 crimes in Spain
Terrorist incidents in Spain in 2001